Giuseppe Maffei (born 28 January 1974) is an Italian former middle distance runner, mainly specialized in 3000 metres steeplechase

He won two medals at the International athletics competitions.

Biography
He competed in the 2000 Summer Olympics and in the 2004 Summer Olympics, he has 12 caps in national team from 1995 to 2004.

National titles
Giuseppe Maffei has won one time the individual national championship.
1 win in 3000 metres steeplechase (2001)

See also
 Italian all-time lists - 3000 metres steeplechase

References

External links
 

1974 births
Living people
Italian male middle-distance runners
Italian male steeplechase runners
Olympic athletes of Italy
Athletes (track and field) at the 2000 Summer Olympics
Athletes (track and field) at the 2004 Summer Olympics
Mediterranean Games bronze medalists for Italy
Athletes (track and field) at the 1997 Mediterranean Games
Universiade medalists in athletics (track and field)
World Athletics Championships athletes for Italy
Mediterranean Games medalists in athletics
Universiade gold medalists for Italy
Medalists at the 1999 Summer Universiade
20th-century Italian people
21st-century Italian people